There are a few streams named Little Sugar River in the United States:

Little Sugar River (New Hampshire)
Little Sugar River (Wisconsin)

See also
South Branch Little Sugar River, in Michigan
 Sugar River (disambiguation)